The Protective Services Battalion (shortened to USAPSB and, officially, the U.S. Army Protective Services Battalion) is a United States Army military police unit responsible for the protection of the United States Secretary of Defense, the United States Army Chief of Staff, and other senior civilian and military officials of the United States Department of Defense (DoD) and U.S. Army.

History

The USAPSB's peacetime protection operations can be traced back to the assignment of executive protection responsibilities within the DoD to the 1st Military Police Detachment in the late 1960s during heightened domestic unrest caused by the Vietnam War. In 1971, subsequent to the establishment of the U.S. Army Criminal Investigation Command as a major Army command, the Protective Services Activity was established to manage Department of Defense protective missions. During the build-up to the 1991 Gulf War, the PSA was reorganized as the Protective Services Unit (PSU). In October 2005, the unit was again reorganized as the Protective Services Battalion. In 2007, it was again reorganized to become the U.S. Army Protective Services Battalion.

Composition 

Around a quarter of all Special Agents assigned to the Criminal Investigation Command are assigned to the USAPSB.

See also
 United States Secret Service
 Royal Military Police Close Protection Unit

References

Protective security units
United States Army organization